Jaime Bascon (born 31 December 1963) is a Bolivian alpine skier. He competed in the men's giant slalom at the 1988 Winter Olympics.

References

External links
 

1963 births
Living people
Bolivian male alpine skiers
Olympic alpine skiers of Bolivia
Alpine skiers at the 1988 Winter Olympics
Place of birth missing (living people)
20th-century Bolivian people
21st-century Bolivian people